Soothsayers are a London-based band who perform and record original afrobeat and reggae-influenced music. Founded in 1998 by sax player Idris Rahman and trumpeter Robin Hopcraft, they have released five studio albums and a series of vinyl singles on their own label Red Earth Records.

Band History

Soothsayers' first album 'Lost City' was released in 2000. The band spent their formative period performing in venues around South London and developing a compositional style influenced mainly by the music of South African township musicians such as Abdullah Ibrahim and Hugh Masekela, and instrumental reggae artists such as Tommy McCook and the Skatalites. The album also includes the song 'Follow Your Path', which features Nigerian singer/musician Adesose Wallace and shows the band developing their own version of afrobeat which was to become an important feature of their subsequent work. 'Lost City' also features the South African guitarist Lucky Ranku, as well as many London-based musicians who became part of the Soothsayers collective.

The second album 'Tangled Roots' was released in 2005 and was a more afrobeat-inspired set featuring collaborations with Keziah Jones, Adesose Wallace, Maxi Jazz and Netsayi Chigwendere. With Rahman and Hopcraft writing, producing and mixing, this album is a more studio-based, produced album than 'Lost City', and represents a step forward in the pair's desire to bring together elements of afrobeat groove and melody with dub production and sonics. Soothsayers released the track 'Blinded Souls' from this album as a ten-inch vinyl single, featuring remixes by Quantic and Mad professor.

The third studio album 'One More Reason' (2009) (credited as Soothsayers and the Red Earth Collective) featured a collection of veteran reggae artists including Johnny Clarke, Michael Prophet and Linval Thompson. This album was the first to feature mixes by London-based reggae producer and dj Manasseh, and also was the first album to feature the harmony vocal style which has since become a major feature of the band's sound.

'Red Earth Dub' (2010) was Soothsayers' subsequent release which is largely a collection of dubs and remixes by Manasseh and which also features two new compositions which are collaborations with Manasseh.

On their most recent album 'Human Nature' (released in October 2012), Soothsayers have fully developed their own three-part harmony vocal style (using the voices of Rahman, Hopcraft and more recent band member Julia Biel) which has become an integral part of the sound. Still fundamentally inspired by dub, reggae and afrobeat, the sound now has a unique compositional and production style, resulting from years of development and experimentation bringing together the various strands of bass-heavy, groove-inspired music that has characterised their output over the last decade. 'Human Nature' has been played by DJs on BBC Radio 2, Radio 3, Radio 4, BBC 6 music and numerous radios stations worldwide. It was featured on Gilles Peterson's 'Best of 2012' show.

Soothsayers signed to London-based label Wah Wah 45s in 2017, and the label has released two EPs so far - 'Speak to my Soul' and 'Speak to my Soul Remixed', (released in July and September 2017 respectively). There are 3 single releases planned for early 2018, and Soothsayers next full studio album will be released in June 2018.

Touring

Throughout their career the band have maintained a busy touring schedule, performing with various line-ups throughout the UK, Europe and beyond, and playing at many of the major jazz, reggae and world music festivals including Rototom Sunsplash, the North Sea Jazz Festival and Glastonbury Festival. Soothsayers have also performed and toured extensively with Johnny Clarke, Michael Prophet and Cornel Campbell, performing some of their classics as well as new collaborative material.

Collaborations
Hopcraft and Rahman have also collaborated with many other musical artists including Osibisa, Mad Professor, Rico Rodrigues, Jerry Dammers, Ayub Ogada, Aswad, Julia Biel, Zoe Rahman and Arun Ghosh. In 2011 they were asked by members of the band Antibalas to take part in the London production of the musical 'Fela!', about the life of afrobeat creator Fela Kuti, which ran for four months at London's National Theatre. Hopcraft was the musical director and trumpeter and Rahman played lead sax part mimed to by the actor in the title role.

The Band

 Robin Hopcraft (trumpet, vocals, production)
 Idris Rahman (sax, vocals, production)
 Kodjovi Kush (bass, vocals)
 Patrick Illingworth (drums)
 Julia Biel (vocals)
 Phil Dawson (guitar)
 Patrick Hatchett (guitar)
 Kishon Khan (keyboards)

Members of the wider Soothsayers Collective

 Westley Joseph (drums)
 Zoe Rahman (keyboards)
 Adesose Wallace (vocals)
 Yuval "Juba" Wezler (drums)
 Frank Tontoh (drums)
 Lucky Ranku (guitar)

Discography

Albums

 Lost City (2000, Red Earth Records)
 Tangled Roots (2004, Red Earth Records)
 One More Reason (2009, Red Earth Records)
 Red Earth Dub (2010, Red Earth Records)
 Human Nature (2012, Red Earth Records)

EPs and Singles

 Blinded Souls 10", featuring remixes by Quantic and Mad Professor (2005, Red Earth Records)
 Bad Boys 7', featuring Johnny Clarke (2009, Red Earth Records)
 Love Fire 7", featuring Michael Prophet (2009, Red Earth Records)
 I'll Never Leave/I'm Leaving 7", featuring Cornel Campbell and Lutan Fyah (2011, Red Earth Records)
 We're Not Leaving 7" (2012, Red Earth Records)
 We're Not Leaving 12" (2012, Red Earth Records)

Compilations featured

 Vibrations from the Motherland ("Crocodiles" featuring Busi Mholongo, 2008, Melt 2000)

References

Musical groups from London